Brian Murphy (born 1943 in Crosshaven, County Cork) is an Irish former sportsperson. He played Gaelic football with his local clubs Crosshaven and St Finbarr's and was a member of the Cork senior inter-county team from 1965 until 1970.

References

1943 births
Living people
Cork inter-county Gaelic footballers
Gaelic football goalkeepers
St Finbarr's Gaelic footballers